Ferdinand d'Huart  (13 April 1857 – 27 January 1919) was a painter from Luxembourg.

his life
He was born into an upper-class family. Ferdinand d'Huart was also known by his nickname Fenny.He studied at the art academies of Munich and Paris. He became a student of the French painter Alexandre Cabanel. He worked for a while in the  Collège des Oratoriens school in Juilly-sur-Seine, but later on he returned to Luxembourg. Here he became a teacher at the Kolléisch. He gained a reputation on painting the grand-ducal family of Luxembourg. From 1910 until 1919 Ferdinand d'Huart was the president of the Cercle artistique de Luxembourg.

His daughter, Adrienne d'Huart (1892–1984) was a painter as well.

In Bonnevoie a street was named after him: rue Fernand d'Huart.

Literature 
 APEA:Regard, Album erausgi vun der Association des Professeurs d'Education Artistique de l'Enseignement Secondaire et Supérieur, 1987, Editions St.-Paul
 Friedrich, E.: Ferdinand d'Huart, Porträt- und Blumenmaler, Revue Nr. 52, 1979

 Portrait vum Ferdinand d'Huart um Site vun der Gemeng Wanseler; archivéiert Versioun

1857 births
1919 deaths
Alumni of the Athénée de Luxembourg
19th-century Luxembourgian painters
19th-century male artists
20th-century Luxembourgian painters
20th-century male artists
Male painters